Rowley Faust (21 February 1899 – 24 June 1959) was an Australian rules footballer who played with Carlton in the Victorian Football League (VFL).

Notes

External links 

Rowley Faust's profile at Blueseum

1899 births
1959 deaths
Australian rules footballers from Melbourne
Australian Rules footballers: place kick exponents
Carlton Football Club players
Brunswick Football Club players
People from Kensington, Victoria